The Producers Guild of America (PGA) is a 501(c)(6) trade association representing television producers, film producers and New Media producers in the United States. The PGA's membership includes over 8,000 members of the producing establishment worldwide. Its co-presidents are Gail Berman and Lucy Fisher. The PGA is overseen by a board of directors that represents producers from across the nation. Susan Sprung has served as the organization's National Executive Director since 2019. 

The Producers Guild of America offers several benefits to its members, including seminars and mentoring programs, and entrance to special screenings of movies during Oscar season.

History
The Producers Guild of America began as two separate organizations, with the Screen Producers Guild being formed on May 16, 1950. Its first president was William Perlberg. In 1957, television producers followed suit, forming the Television Producers Guild, with Ben Brady as its first president. These merged in 1962 to form the PGA under producer Walter Mirisch. Subsequent Presidents of the PGA have included Stanley Rubin, Leonard B. Stern, Kathleen Kennedy, Marshall Herskovitz, and the teams of Hawk Koch / Mark Gordon, and Gary Lucchesi / Lori McCreary.

The Golden Laurel Awards (subsequently renamed the Producers Guild of America Awards, a.k.a. PGA Awards) were first held in 1990, establishing the Guild Awards as one of the bellwethers for the Academy Awards. 20 of the 29 winners of the Producers Guild of America Award for Best Theatrical Motion Picture have gone on to win the Academy Award for Best Picture.

The Producers Guild of America's awards show was originally established in 1990 as the Golden Laurel Awards, created by PGA Treasurer Joel Freeman, Diane Robison, Terrie Frankel, Bernard Wiesen, and Charles B. FitzSimons with the support of Guild President Leonard B. Stern, in order to honor the visionaries who produce and execute motion picture and television product. The ceremony has been hosted each year by celebrity host/presenters, including Ronald Reagan, Ted Turner, Garry Marshall, Jack Lemmon, James Earl Jones, Grant Tinker, Michael Douglas, Walter Matthau, Shirley MacLaine, Marlo Thomas, Kevin Spacey, Mark Wahlberg, Kerry Washington, Anne Hathaway, Steve Carell, Neil Patrick Harris and Jennifer Lawrence, among others. 

In 2001, the Producers Guild of America merged with the American Association of Producers (AAP), enabling the Guild to represent all members of the producing team. Since that time, the Guild has been composed of three Councils: The Producers Council (representing producers, executive producers and co-producers), the AP Council (representing associate producers, production managers, production supervisors, segment and field producers, production coordinators, visual effects producers, and post-production staff) and the New Media Council.

In 2001, producers John Schwally, Nelle Nugent and Steven Rosenbaum established the Producers Guild of America East Regional Chapter of the Guild, located in New York and servicing Guild members based on the East Coast. Since 2012, Peter Saraf has served as chair of the region.

In 2002, the Producers Guild established its New Media Council to recognize and represent producers working outside traditional television and film formats including, but not limited to, games (console, online and mobile), digital effects, digital animation, broadband and mobile storytelling, and more recently virtual reality, augmented reality and location-based attractions.

The Producers Guild of America has an international committee aimed towards connecting producers across nations in creative industries. Founded by Stuart J. Levy, Nicholas de Wolff and William Stuart, it is presently co-chaired by Elizabeth Dell and Kayvan Mashayekh.

Vance Van Petten served as the organization's National Executive Director from 2000 through 2021. Susan Sprung joined him in that position in 2019. 

On January 19, 2018, the Producers Guild of America adopted new sexual harassment guidelines.

The Producers Mark (p.g.a.)
In 2012, the Producers Guild introduced the "Producers Mark", a certification mark to feature film credits, allowing approved producers to add the lowercase initials p.g.a. following their "Produced By" credit.

Unlike other post-nominal letters that appear in motion picture credits (e.g., A.C.E., C.S.A.), the "Producers Mark" does not indicate membership in the Producers Guild. Rather, it certifies that the credited producer performed a major portion of the producing duties on a motion picture. The Mark is licensed for use in motion picture credits on a film-by-film basis. A producer's having received the Mark on a prior film has no impact on the decision to certify a current or future credit with the "Producers Mark".

During 2012 and 2013, Producers Guild of America Presidents Hawk Koch and Mark Gordon conducted negotiations and secured separate agreements with every major Hollywood studio requiring the studios to submit any films they developed and produced internally for "Producers Mark" certification. The first film to be released with the "Producers Mark" was The Magic of Belle Isle (which certified producers Lori McCreary, Alan Greisman, and Rob Reiner with the Mark), followed almost immediately thereafter by Lawless (which certified producers Lucy Fisher and Douglas Wick). Since that time, hundreds of motion pictures have had their credits certified via the "Producers Mark".

The Producers Guild determines which credited producers are eligible for certification via a thorough vetting process, requiring initial application from the film's owner/distributor and candid input from its producers, as well as numerous third party sources, which may include the film's director, writers, editors, cinematographer or other department heads. The Guild uses the same process to recommend which producers are eligible for producing honors and awards, including the Guild's "Darryl F. Zanuck Award" and the Academy Award for Best Picture given by the Academy of Motion Picture Arts and Sciences.

Any copyright owner of a film that has an established U.S. distributor may apply for the "Producers Mark", but application for and use of the "Producers Mark" by individual producers is purely voluntary.

New Media Council
In 2002, the New Media Council was formed by the Producers Guild of America in order to recognize, represent, and protect producers working in digital and emerging media such as broadband and mobile entertainment, video games, digital visual effects, interactive television and DVDs.

In January 2001, following a series of summits that brought together members of the New Media and traditional producing communities, producer Marc Levey spearheaded an initiative to revise the Producers Guild of America constitution to provide for the representation of New Media producers. This led to the formation of the New Media Council. Since its formation, the Council has sought to identify and address issues relevant to New Media and the PGA. These include how "New Media" should be defined and how the role of a New Media producer differs from or is similar to its counterpart in traditional media, recognizing that medium must serve the story and not the other way around.

On April 5, 2010, the Producers Guild of America Board of Directors officially approved its New Media Code of Credits, adding twenty-six major new credits to cover New Media producers. The code is significant in that it marks the first time the Producers Guild of America recognized New Media producer industry credits and responsibilities in Broadband, DVD/Blu-ray, Animation, Games (console and online), Mobile, Digital Visual Effects, iTV (interactive/enhanced Television), Special Venues, and Transmedia.

Produced By Conference
Since 2009, the Producers Guild has presented the "Produced By Conference", held annually in June on a studio lot in the Los Angeles area. In 2011, the Conference was held at Disney/ABC Studios. Each Conference offers a variety of educational sessions designed to promote the newest information about the state of the entertainment industry marketplace and allow experienced producers to share the benefit of their experience with emerging professionals. The "Produced By Conference" also offers a variety of other programs, including extensive vendor displays and technology demonstrations, numerous representatives of local, state and international film commissions, small-group Mentoring Roundtable discussions, and a variety of networking events, including the traditional Friday night Kick-Off Party.

Speakers at past conferences have included James Cameron, Clint Eastwood, Mark Cuban, Ted Turner, Gale Anne Hurd, Marshall Herskovitz, Mark Gordon, Hawk Koch, Alan Ball, Kathleen Kennedy, Matthew Weiner, Richard D. Zanuck, James L. Brooks, Douglas Wick, Lucy Fisher, Roger Corman, Norman Lear, Lawrence Gordon, Francis Ford Coppola, Seth Rogen, Kevin Smith, and Lauren Shuler Donner.

In 2011, the "Produced By Conference" was presented in association with AFCI Locations.

Since 2014, the Producers Guild of America has presented "Produced By: New York", a single-day conference event held annually in New York City. Speakers and guests at "Produced By: New York" have included Michael Moore, Alejandro González Iñárritu, Jake Gyllenhaal, Donna Gigliotti, James Schamus, Jenni Konner, Darren Aronofsky, Barbara Hall and Cathy Schulman, among others.

Producers Guild Award

In 1990, the Producers Guild held the first-ever Golden Laurel Awards, which were renamed the Producers Guild of America Awards in 2002. Richard D. Zanuck and Lili Fini Zanuck received the award for Driving Miss Daisy, which also won the Academy Award for Best Picture.

Film winners

2023 winners
 Theatrical Motion Picture
 * Everything Everywhere All at Once
 Anthony Russo, Joe Russo, Mike Larocca, Daniel Kwan, Daniel Scheinert, Jonathan Wang, and Peter Tam Lee
 Animated Motion Picture
 * Guillermo del Toro's Pinocchio
 Guillermo del Toro, Lisa Henson, Gary Ungar, Alex Bulkley, and Corey Campodonico
 Documentary Theatrical Motion Picture
 * Navalny
 Odessa Rae, Diane Becker, Melanie Miller, and Shane Boris

Television winners

2023 winners
 Comedy Series
 * The Bear
 Christopher Storer, Joanna Calo, Josh Senior, Hiro Murai, and Nate Matteson
 Drama Series
 * The White Lotus
 Nick Hall, David Bernad, Mike White, and Mark Kamine
 Limited or Anthology Series
 * The Dropout
 Elizabeth Meriwether, Katherine Pope, Michael Showalter, Jordana Mollick, Rebecca Jarvis, Taylor Dunn, Victoria Thompson, Liz Heldens, and Liz Hannah

Stanley Kramer Award
Since 2002, this award has been given for films that "illuminate provocative social issues". The latest honoree is Chinonye Chukwu's film Till, produced by Keith Beauchamp, Barbara Broccoli, Whoopi Goldberg, Thomas Levine, Michael Reilly, and Frederick Zollo.

The Charles B. FitzSimons Honorary Lifetime Membership Award
For "outstanding contribution and enduring dedication to the Producers Guild of America".

 1991: Charles B. FitzSimons
 1992: Stanley Rubin
 1993: Leonard B. Stern
 1994: Bob Finkel
 1995: Joel Freeman
 1996: Robert B. Radnitz
 1997: Norman Felton
 1999: Charles W. Fries
 2000: Diane L. Robison
 2001: George Sunga
 2002: Marian Rees
 2003: Hawk Koch
 2004: Debra Hill
 2006: Kathleen Kennedy
 2007: Gale Anne Hurd
 2008: David V. Picker
 2009: Tim Gibbons
 2010: Marshall Herskovitz
 2011: Dorothea Petrie
 2012: Fred Baron
 2013: Carole Beams
 2014: Mark Gordon

The AP Council Commitment Award
The "AP Council Commitment Award" is given to a Producers Guild of America member who, in the opinion of the AP Council Board of Delegates, has made extraordinary and long-standing contributions to the Guild as a member of the AP Council. The award is presented to recipients at the Guild's annual general membership meeting.
 2004: Susan Sherayko
 2006: Erin O'Malley
 2007: Victoria Slater
 2008: Pixie Wespiser
 2009: Carole Beams
 2010: Rachel Klein
 2011: Kathleen Courtney
 2012: Christina Lee Storm
 2013: Jeffrey Lerner
 2014: Kay Rothman
 2017: Megan Mascena Gaspar
 2019: Derek Bartholomaus

The Marc A. Levey Distinguished Service Award
This Service Award was originally established in 2006 by the Producers Guild of America in order to recognize and honor any member who has distinguished herself or himself by exceptionally meritorious service to the Producers Guild and its New Media Council. The award is presented to recipients at the Guild's annual membership meeting and entitles recipients to join the Council's Leadership Roundtable.

Past recipients of this award include:
 2006: James Fino, Cindy A. Pound, and Alison Savitch
 2007: Iyan Bruce and Marc Scarpa
 2008: Shawn Gold and Amy Jacobson Kurokawa
 2009: Jeanette DePatie, Brandon Grande, and Chris Pfaff
 2010: John Heinsen, Derek Hildebrant, and Chris Thomes
 2011: Dina Benadon
 2012: Felicia Wong
 2013: Michael Palmieri
 2014: Brian Seth Hurst
 2015: Vicente Williams
 2016: Caitlin Burns
 2017: Emily Barclay Ford
 2018: Renee Rosenfeld
 2019: Kate McCallum
 2020: John Canning
 2021: Ed Lantz
 2022: Charles Howard

History
The award's namesake, Marc Levey, an active member of the Guild since 1995, recognized that games and many other digital productions maintained budgets, timelines and revenues that rivaled those of television and film productions of the time. In 1999, Levey began to spearhead a three-year process within the Producers Guild to recognize, represent and protect the interests of producers working outside the "traditional" formats of television and film. Levey's vision and leadership resulted in the official amendment of the PGA's Constitution and the establishment of the Guild's New Media Council. In recognition of his efforts, the Guild officially established this annual service award in his name.

See also
 Alliance of Motion Picture and Television Producers

References

External links

 

Entertainment industry societies
 
Film organizations in the United States
Organizations established in 1962
Guilds in the United States